La Todolella is a small town and municipality located in the Ports comarca, province of Castelló, part of the autonomous community of Valencia, Spain. According to the 2002 census, it has a total population of 140 inhabitants. One of its places of tourist interest is its medieval castle, dating back to the 14th century.

On February 6, 2005, a gas leak in Sant Cristòfol hostel in Todolella killed 18 people while they slept after a birthday celebration.

References

External links 
 Todolella Web site with information in Spanish.

Municipalities in the Province of Castellón
Ports (comarca)